Martin Liddle (born 19 June 1978) is a New Zealand wrestler. He competed in the men's freestyle 54 kg at the 2000 Summer Olympics.

References

 

1978 births
Living people
New Zealand male sport wrestlers
Olympic wrestlers of New Zealand
Wrestlers at the 2000 Summer Olympics
People from Papakura